HMS Wizard was a 10-gun  built for the Royal Navy during the 1820s. She was wrecked in 1859.

Description
The ship's tonnage was 231 7/94 tons burthen. The Cherokee class was armed with two 6-pounder cannon and eight 18-pounder carronades. The ships had a crew of 52 officers and ratings.

Construction and career
Wizard, the second ship of her name to serve in the Royal Navy, was ordered on 28 October 1826, laid down in October 1828 at Pembroke Dockyard, Wales, and launched on 24 March 1830. She was completed on 15 June 1837 at Plymouth Dockyard. On 29 May 1855, Wizard ran aground at Cork. She lay on her beam ends overnight and was refloated the next day.

Notes

References

Cherokee-class brig-sloops
1830 ships
Ships built in Pembroke Dock
Maritime incidents in May 1855
Maritime incidents in February 1859